Peevyhouse v. Garland Coal & Mining Co., 382 P.2d 109 (Okla. 1962), is a US contract law case decided by the Supreme Court of Oklahoma. It concerns the question of when specific performance of a contractual obligation will be granted and the measure of expectation damages.

Facts
Willie and Lucille Peevyhouse owned a farm containing coal deposits. In November 1954, they entered into a contract with Garland Coal & Mining Co. They gave Garland a five-year lease to strip mine the coal, in return for a royalty, and the promise that the land would be restored once they were done. In the lease agreement was the following:

7d Lessee agrees to leave the creek crossing the above premises in such a condition that it will not interfere with the crossings to be made in pits as set out in 7b.

7f Lessee further agrees to leave no shale or dirt on the high wall of said pits.

Coal mining can often work through digging out underground shafts, but stripping off the land was cheaper. To restore the land the overburden must be shifted back, in this case at a cost of $29,000. When there were recurrent floods, Garland refused to put the land back. The Peevyhouses sued. The jury returned a verdict for the Peevyhouses for $5,000 and Garland appealed again.

Judgment
The Supreme Court of Oklahoma found that, while the coal company breached its contract with the Peevyhouses, Garland did not have to fix the property nor pay for the work necessary to restore the land, but instead could just pay the Peevyhouses for the difference in land value.  The land, while destroyed, had only lost $300 in value.  The court found that to pay the Peevyhouses to restore their land would be an economic waste, since the $25,000 in labor would result only in a $300 improvement of the land. Justice Jackson gave the leading judgment.

Justices Welch, Davison, Halley and Johnson concurred. Chief Justice Williams, Blackbird VCJ, Berry J and Irwin J dissented. Justice Irwin's dissent went as follows.

Addendum
According to Swan, Reiter and Bala, "Two of the judges who sided with the majority in Peevyhouse were later involved in a serious bribery scandal. There is some suggestion that counsel for Garland Coal could have improperly influenced some of the judges in other cases, but there is no suggestion that a bribe affected the outcome in Peevyhouse, a case of relatively little financial consequence to Garland Coal."

Controversy

The United States Court of Appeals for the Tenth Circuit determined in Rock Island Improvement Co. v. Helmerich & Payne, Inc., 698 F.2d 1075 (10th Cir. 1984) that the Oklahoma Supreme Court relied on an Oklahoma statute providing that "no person can recover a greater amount in damages for a breach of an obligation than he would have gained by the full performance thereof on both sides," and that this rule was subsequently restricted by the Open Cut Land Reclamation Act of 1967, declaring it the policy of Oklahoma "to provide, after mining operations are completed, for the reclamation and conservation of land subjected to surface disturbance by open cut mining."  Therefore, reasoned the Tenth Circuit, "We are convinced that the Oklahoma Supreme Court would no longer apply the rule it established in Peevyhouse in 1963."

Relying on Rock Island, the United States District Court for the Western District of Oklahoma in Davis v. Shell Oil Co. (795 F.Supp. 381) asserted as fact that "courts in Oklahoma do not follow Peevyhouse."  However, in a rebuke to both Federal Courts, the Oklahoma Supreme Court sharply reasserted the Peevyhouse rule in Schneberger v. Apache Corp., 890 P.2d 847 (Okla. 1994), declaring "[w]hatever the rationale, the essence of the Peevyhouse holding--to award diminution in value rather, than cost of performance, has been consistently adhered to... and it still represents the majority view."

See also
US contract law
Cutter v Powell
Robinson v Harman (1848) 18 LJ Ex 202

Notes

External links
 
Case Brief for Peevyhouse v. Garland Coal & Mining Co. at Lawnix.com

1962 in Oklahoma
1962 in United States case law
Oklahoma state case law
United States contract case law
Mining in Oklahoma
Coal mining in the United States